The Cairnton Stone is a class I Pictish stone that was discovered at Cairnton, near Newmachar, Aberdeenshire, Scotland in 2001. The stone bears the incised symbols of the Crescent and V-rod and triple disc. The stone is now in the collection of the Marischal Museum, Aberdeen.

References

External links

Pictish stones
Pictish stones in Aberdeenshire